Alice, Sweet Alice (originally titled Communion) is a 1976 American psychological slasher film co-written and directed by Alfred Sole, and starring Linda Miller, Paula Sheppard, and Brooke Shields in her film debut. Set in 1961 New Jersey, the film focuses on a troubled adolescent girl who becomes a suspect in the brutal murder of her younger sister at her First Communion, as well as in a series of unsolved stabbings that follow.

Inspired by Nicolas Roeg's Don't Look Now (1973) and the films of Alfred Hitchcock, writer-director Sole devised the screenplay with Rosemary Ritvo, an English professor who was his neighbor. At the time, Sole had been working as an architect restoring historic buildings in his hometown of Paterson, New Jersey, and several properties he had worked on were used as shooting locations. Filming took place throughout the summer of 1975 in Paterson and Newark.

The film premiered at the Chicago International Film Festival under its original title, Communion, in November 1976, and was released under this title in London in September 1977. After being acquired by Allied Artists, it was re-titled Alice, Sweet Alice, and released in the United States on November 18, 1977. Another theatrical re-release occurred in 1981 under the title Holy Terror, which marketed the popularity of Shields after her performance in Louis Malle's Pretty Baby (1978). While not prosecuted for obscenity, the film was seized and confiscated in the UK under Section 3 of the Obscene Publications Act 1959 during the video nasty panic, and was controversial in Ireland due to its apparent anti-Catholic themes.

In the years since its release, Alice, Sweet Alice has gained a cult following and is considered a contemporary classic of the slasher subgenre in critical circles. It has also been the focus of scholarship in the areas of horror film studies, particularly regarding its depictions of Roman Catholicism, child emotional neglect, and the disintegration of the American nuclear family.

Plot 
In 1961, in Paterson, New Jersey, divorced mother Catherine Spages visits Father Tom with her two daughters, nine-year-old Karen and twelve-year-old Alice, who both attend St. Michael's Parish Girls' School. Karen is preparing for her First Communion, and Father Tom gives her his mother's crucifix as a gift. A jealous Alice puts on a translucent mask, frightening Father Tom's housekeeper, Mrs. Tredoni. Alice steals Karen's porcelain doll, scares her, and threatens her if she tells anyone.

On the day of her First Communion, Karen is strangled to death in the church transept by a person wearing a translucent mask and a yellow raincoat, her crucifix ripped from her neck, and her body set on fire. A nun makes the horrific discovery, disrupting the communion ceremony.

After Karen's funeral, Catherine's ex-husband Dominick begins independently investigating her murder, while Detective Spina formally handles the case. Catherine's sister Annie moves in to help her, though Alice and Annie despise each other. Catherine sends Alice to deliver a rent check to their landlord, the morbidly obese Mr. Alphonso, and he attempts to molest her. Annie is attacked by a masked figure. At the hospital, she claims that Alice tried to kill her. Alice is sent to a psychiatric institution for evaluation.

Dominick receives a hysterical phone call from someone claiming to be Annie's daughter Angela, saying that she has Karen's crucifix. Dominick agrees to meet her at an abandoned building. There, the figure stabs him before binding him with rope. Dominick sees that the killer is in fact Mrs. Tredoni, who chastises Dominick and Catherine as sinners over their premarital sex and divorce. After Dominick bites Karen's crucifix off her neck, Mrs. Tredoni pushes him out a window to his death.

Catherine goes to visit Father Tom. He is not home but Mrs. Tredoni invites her in. She explains that when her own daughter died on the day of her First Communion, she realized children are punished for the sins of their parents. In her grief and madness, she devotes herself to the church. Father Tom arrives and tells Catherine that Dom has died. During Dominick's autopsy, the pathologist finds Karen's crucifix in his mouth, and Alice is eliminated as a suspect. Father Tom and Catherine go get Alice from the institution.

Mrs. Tredoni sneaks into Catherine's apartment building. Mr. Alphonso wakes up screaming, as Alice had mischievously placed a jar of cockroaches on him while he slept. Mr. Alphonso encounters Mrs. Tredoni in the staircase and mistakes her for Alice. When he shoves her against a wall, she stabs him to death and flees. Detective Spina witnesses her running out without a mask on.

Mrs. Tredoni rushes to the church, where the police are stationed. Spina arrives too late to save Mr. Alphonso. At the mass, Father Tom denies Mrs. Tredoni communion. She stabs the priest in the throat as the police rush in. While Father Tom bleeds to death, Alice walks out of the church with Mrs. Tredoni's shopping bag, and places the bloodstained butcher knife into it.

Cast

Analysis and themes

Catholicism 

Numerous film scholars have noted the film's hysterical portrayal of Catholicism and religious institutions to be in direct confluence with the motives of its villain, Mrs. Tredoni, whose ultimate goal is to "punish" the sinning members of her parish; this has resulted in some claiming the film to be overtly "anti-Catholic".

Writer-director Sole's own proclaiming of himself as an "ex-Catholic" supports this interpretation of the film's religious themes and undertones. Prior to writing and directing Alice, Sweet Alice, Sole had directed his debut feature, an adult film titled Deep Sleep, in 1972. The release of the film resulted in obscenity charges being brought against him in the state of New Jersey, as well as formal excommunication from the Roman Catholic Diocese of Paterson, New Jersey; this event has been credited as influential to the apparent anti-religious bent of Alice, Sweet Alice.

The murder scenes in the film in particular have been described by genre scholars such as John Kenneth Muir as "stark and shocking," and noted for their use of "powerful imagery" correlating with the film's religious overtones. Muir views the film as a precursor to such films as Seven (1995), which focus on individuals being punished by death for their sins and character flaws. Catholic iconography is featured prominently throughout the film, including votive candles, crucifixes, and rosaries, as well as artistic depictions of the Virgin Mary in sculptures and paintings.

Sheila O'Malley of Film Comment notes that: "From one scene to the next, religious iconography overwhelms the screen: paintings of Mary and Christ, marble statues, crosses on every wall, religion leering at the characters from behind. Parishioners kneel at the altar, pushing out fat tongues for communion (Communion was the film's original title), looking like a parade of aggressive Rolling Stones logos. Religion is not a refuge in Alice, Sweet Alice. It is a rejection of the body itself, but the body—its tongues, its teeth, its menstruation—will not be denied."

Additionally, Chuck Bowen of Slant Magazine observes that the presentation of the church sequences signifies a closed-in nature that "favors cramped medium shots and close-ups that induce claustrophobia. The characters always appear to be cramped together in the church, on top of one another, and their homes are composed of similarly small passageways." Despite this, Bowen asserts that the film is not "exactly an indictment of the church," but rather a "febrile portrait...  of how society enables dysfunction on multiple fronts, from the domestic to the religious to the psychiatric."

Familial dissolution 
Bowen notes familial dissolution as a theme in Alice, Sweet Alice, citing the backstory involving the Spages and Dominick's separation from Catherine: "Sole allows these reverberations, particularly the parallel bitterness existing between Catherine and Annie and Karen and Alice, both of which have been intensified by religion, to gradually assert themselves into our minds...  Catherine and Dom's splintered relationship is also portrayed as a gateway to chaos, primarily for Catherine's distracted nature and unwillingness to face the truth of her family."

Scholar Claire Sisco King notes in a 2007 essay that the film is preoccupied with the theme of theatrical performativity perpetrated by children who are emotionally neglected by their parents. King suggests that the title character of Alice is ostracized by her mother and aunt, and lacking attention from her absent father, who only returns after Karen's murder. King elaborates on Alice's performativity:

Writer David J. Hogan considers Alice, Sweet Alice among a series of films made between the 1970s and 1980s preoccupied with sibling rivalry, and which feature "violations of the integrity of the nuclear family." Hogan views the film as an extension of such features as What Ever Happened to Baby Jane? (1962), an earlier film that blended horror with familial drama between siblings.

Production

Development 

Director Alfred Sole began writing the film in 1974, collaborating with co-writer Rosemary Ritvo on the script. Ritvo, an English doctoral student at Fordham University, was Sole's neighbor, and the two often talked about films together. "She was a Catholic and we would talk about the Catholic church, religion and stuff like that. Then we started talking about films and theater and I discovered she had a great love of horror films," Sole recalled. The two began meeting during weekends and workshopping the screenplay together. At the time, Sole was working as an architect in New Jersey.

Sole was inspired to make the film after seeing Nicolas Roeg's 1973 psychological thriller, Don't Look Now, based on the novel by Daphne du Maurier. As a result, Alice, Sweet Alice makes several visual references to Don't Look Now, namely the usage of the raincoat which is featured on the villains in both films. In developing the character of Alice, Sole and screenwriter Ritvo aspired to create a "child who has been neglected, and who could go either way," dividing the audience in regards to her guilt or innocence in the crimes committed. Sole chose to set the film in 1960s-era Paterson, New Jersey, his hometown, and culled much of the family drama and dynamics from his own Italian-Catholic upbringing. The character of Mrs. Tredoni, the villain, was based on a woman who lived at the Catholic rectory next-door to his grandmother's house and looked after the clergy.

Sole was also influenced by the works of Alfred Hitchcock, as well as the 1955 French film Les Diaboliques, while assembling compositions in the film. Although many critics have drawn comparisons to Italian giallo films and the works of Dario Argento in particular, Sole claimed to have not seen Argento's work at the time. Nonetheless, the film's incorporation of subtle dark humor and its unsympathetic portrayal of religion — both motifs of giallo thrillers — led to the film's reputation as the most "gialloesque" American film in history.

Casting 
Sole, at the time an inexperienced filmmaker, did not have a casting director to cast the film, and instead would approach various stage actors about playing the parts. "I didn't have a working knowledge of what an actor does," Sole recalled, so I started going to a lot of theater." Sole would approach actors after shows with his screenplay in hopes of casting them. Brooke Shields was the first to be cast in the film after auditioning in New York City in 1975; director Sole had seen her modeling in a Vogue advertisement, and contacted her mother about the film, expressing his interest in her playing the role of young Karen. For her audition, Shields was required to mime as though she were being strangled to death. Sole recalled that Shields's mother "bent over backwards to help me out." Sole cast Paula Sheppard, then a college student, as 12-year-old Alice, the protagonist suspected of her sister's murder. At the time of being cast, Sheppard was 18 years old, and had been discovered by Sole while working as a dancer in stage productions at Connecticut College. Though playing a 12-year-old, Sheppard celebrated her 19th birthday during the shoot in early July 1976. Linda Miller, an actress and daughter of Jackie Gleason, was cast in the role of Alice and Karen's mother, Catherine.

Of the supporting cast, Alphonso De Noble, a New Jersey native, was cast as the sleazy landlord after director Sole had seen him impersonating a priest in local cemeteries. Sole had originally sought veteran stage actress Geraldine Page for the role of Mrs. Tredoni; Page, however, could not due to obligations in a Broadway production, but recommended fellow stage actress Mildred Clinton, who played the role. Tom Signorelli, who played Detective Brennan, an officer investigating the crimes, was a New York stage actor. Lillian Roth, a former film actress-turned-Broadway performer, was cast in a minor role as the pathologist, marking her first film role in decades.

In the years after the film's release, Sole spoke favorably of Shields and Sheppard, though he recalled that much of the cast were "New York actors who were doing me a favor." He also commented that he and Miller clashed significantly, describing her as "really difficult to work with...  A real nightmare." Despite this, he conceded: "Linda is an excellent actor; they all are."

Filming 

The film was primarily shot on location in Paterson, New Jersey in the summer of 1975, with much of the crew being based out of New York City. While some newspaper sources stated the budget was $1 million, Sole claimed the film ultimately cost $350,000. To help finance the film, Sole refinanced his home and cleared his life savings. "My family was really supportive," he recalled, "and my mother cooked for the crew, my neighbors chipped in; everyone was just so kind and supportive of me that we eventually got it made." In addition to Paterson, some photography took place in the city of Newark.

Approximately 90% of the film was shot using a 16 mm camera, as Sole wanted the frames to have "wide" appearance with significant foreground. Sole's occupation as a local restorational architect in Paterson helped him secure several shooting locations, effectively lending the film a modern Gothic aesthetic. Among the Paterson locations was the historic Rogers Locomotive and Machine Works building, where several sequences were filmed. Exteriors of the church were shot at St. Michael's Parish in Newark and the First Presbyterian Church in Paterson (demolished two years after filming), while the church interiors were filmed inside a hospital chapel. Additional interior photography took place at the Governor Morris Hotel in Morris Township. The stairwell interiors of the Spages' apartment building were filmed inside the historic former home of manufacturer John Ryle.

The production was periodically postponed during filming, with Sole stating that sometimes two to four week breaks would be taken between filming sessions due to budget issues, during which the production sought out additional funding. On one occasion, filming was temporarily halted after actress Linda Miller attempted suicide by slitting her wrists while shooting the film's final sequence in the church. After a week of convalescing, Miller returned to the set and completed her scenes, though a bandage can be seen on her wrist in several sequences. Because of the repeated starts and stops, the production had to recurrently hire new cameramen; Sole estimated that a total of six different cameramen worked on the film. The total number of shooting days was around 20, as estimated by Sole.

For the film's special effects, which included multiple murder sequences by bludgeoning and stabbing, Sole hired friend William Lustig, who would later direct the cult horror film Maniac (1980). Lustig also worked as an assistant cameraman on the film. Dick Vorisek, who had previously worked on Dog Day Afternoon (1975) and Carrie (1976), was hired onto the film as chief sound engineer after Sole was put in contact with him through Technicolor. The special effects in the film were achieved via practical methods, such as the stabbing sequences, which were shot using a fake retractable knife designed by Sole's friend, an engineer.

Release

Theatrical distribution 
The film premiered under the title Communion at the Chicago International Film Festival in the fall of 1976, where it earned a Silver Medal award. Columbia Pictures signed on to distribute the film in the United States, and secured a book tie-in by author Frank Lauria, which was eventually published in 1977 by Bantam Books. The studio's chief stipulation was that Sole cut a total of three minutes out of the film, to which he agreed. However, following a monetary dispute between Columbia and producer Richard Rosenberg, Columbia ultimately dropped the film from their roster. In the United Kingdom, Hemdale Film Corporation purchased distribution rights to the film, premiering it in London on September 8, 1977, under its original Communion title.

Allied Artists subsequently purchased the film for North American distribution, and forced the filmmakers to change the title from Communion to Alice, Sweet Alice, out of fear that the public would perceive it to be a Christian film. Allied Artists' revised title, Alice, Sweet Alice, originated from a quote in Volume 16 of the Publications of the Catholic Truth Society, published in 1898, which reads: "Then there is Alice—sweet Alice—your eldest born, who leans over the back of your chair and sweeps your face with her brown curls." Director Sole reportedly fought Allied Artists on the changing of the title to no avail; the film was ultimately released as Alice, Sweet Alice in the United States on November 18, 1977. In some cities, such as Pensacola, Florida, the film was screened under the alternate title The Mask Murders.

Following the rising fame of Brooke Shields after her performance in Pretty Baby (1978), the film was released for a third time in 1981 under the title Holy Terror.

Critical response 
Alice, Sweet Alice received mixed reviews from critics upon release. Roger Ebert gave the film a favorable review, stating: "Director Alfred Sole has a brilliant touch for the macabre and there are some splendidly chilling scenes," while US Magazine called the film a "superior modern Gothic thriller."

Daniel Ruth of The Tampa Tribune praised the screenplay, referring to it as "a tight, well-paced melodrama that keeps its audience guessing who the murderer is until the last possible moment," while Leonard Maltin awarded the film a mixed 2 out of 4 stars, calling it "[an] OK murder  mystery."

Bill Brownstein of the Montreal Gazette deemed the film "a gory and effective" surprise, praising its cinematography despite its story having "gaps and inconsistencies."

Some critics, such as Vincent Canby of The New York Times, noted the authenticity of the film's characters and settings: "Mr. Sole, whose first feature this is, knows how to direct actors, how to manipulate suspense and when to shift gears: the identity of the killer is revealed at just that point when the audience is about to make the identification, after which the film becomes less of a horror film than an exercise in suspense. He also has a good feeling for the lower middle-class locale and the realities of the lives of the people who live in it."

Ernest Leogrande of the New York Daily News echoed Canby's sentiment, awarding the film two-and-a-half stars out of four and writing that it "has qualities that take it out of the usual run of sanguinary homicidal horror movies, an attention given to dialogue, to authenticity of setting and to revelatory and atmospheric touches."

Despite favorable reviews, numerous critics deemed the film obscene due to its violent and religious content, among them Linda Gross of the Los Angeles Times, who, though praising of Sheppard and Shields's performances, summarized the film as "foul...  Alice, which offers 105 minutes of atrociousness and bloody homicides perpetrated upon children by other children and infirm adults, is an obscenity."

The Boston Globes Michael Blowen similarly deemed the film a "gross vulgarity of an exploitation picture [that] begins as a slick, glossy thriller [but] gradually degenerates into a bloody mess... Sole employs craftsmanlike camerawork and swift editing in an attempt to gloss over the inconsistent script, but this film's complete lack of originality cannot be hidden."

William Whitaker of the Abilene Reporter-News similarly criticized the film's violence as "a little too much after awhile," but conceded that the "script has enough imagination and the direction enough insight to make it passable fare as far as these kind of films go." The film's depiction of Catholicism in an unfavorable light also drew ire from reviewers: Tom McElfresh of The Cincinnati Enquirer was particularly critical of this, describing the film as "wholly, totally terrible," and a "mishmash full of sexual innuendo and rage at the Catholic church." In Ireland, the film was notably controversial due to its perceived anti-Catholic themes.

Home media 
During the changes in distributors and due to a myriad of legal problems, the film was not properly registered with the United States Copyright Office in 1975 during its production. As a result, the film became widely bootlegged in the following years. Some VHS versions of the film released in the 1980s feature a truncated 98-minute cut of the film, such as a release by Celebrity Home Entertainment in 1987.

In 1997, Anchor Bay Entertainment released the film on VHS in its 108-minute, fully uncut version, with remastering supervised by director Alfred Sole. A DVD edition was subsequently released by Anchor Bay in 1999. After this edition of the film became out of print, it was re-released on DVD by Hen's Tooth Video in 2007.

In the UK, the film has undergone controversy due to the Video Nasty debacle and never had a proper video release until 2003. The first UK release was by Video International on DVD, utilizing a NTSC-PAL converted 4:3 video master with BBFC cuts to the scene where a kitten is aggressively grabbed and thrown around the room (which eventually ended up getting waved with later DVD releases, as it was discovered the cat grabbing shot was a camera angle trick and that a stuffed toy kitten was used for the tossing shots).

In 2014, 88 Films had put out on the first ever anamorphic widescreen DVD in the UK, utilizing a digitally processed and noise reduced version of the 1997 Laserdisc master used for the Anchor Bay and Hens Tooth DVD releases. 88 Films then followed up with a UK premiere on Blu-ray on July 9, 2018. This release utilizes a 2k restoration of a 35mm print being the 1981 "Holy Terror" reissue and bearing said title card.

In May 2019, Arrow Films, in conjunction with Warner Home Video and director Alfred Sole, confirmed they will be releasing a North American Blu-ray edition of the film on August 6, 2019. Arrow's edition utilizes a 2K restoration of the camera negative, sporting both the original "Communion" and "Holy Terror" versions, along with several newly produced extras and the alternate "Alice, Sweet Alice" opening credits.

Legacy 
In the years following its release, Alice, Sweet Alice garnered a reputation as a cult film. On the review aggregator website Rotten Tomatoes, Alice, Sweet Alice holds an 77% approval rating based on thirteen critic reviews, with an average rating of 6.60/10.

Patrick Legare of AllMovie called the film an "eerie, effective chiller," praising the film's cinematography, and awarding it four-and-a-half out of five stars, while TV Guide praised it as "an excellent low-budget horror film from director Sole, whose impressive grasp of filmmaking technique and eye for the grotesque keeps the viewer on edge throughout the movie." Ed Gonzalez of Slant Magazine noted in his 2005 review of the film: "Possibly the closest American relation to an Italian giallo, the film is head-trippingly hilarious (Jane Lowry, as Aunt Annie, may be the nuttiest screamer in the history of cinema) and features some of the more disquieting set pieces you'll ever see in a horror film." Time Out, London praised the film for constructing "a running commentary on the themes of Alfred Hitchcock: against a carefully evoked background of Catholicism emerge twin themes of repression and guilt."

Horror film scholar Scott Aaron Stine, in The Gorehound's Guide to Splatter Films of the 1960s and 1970s, notes the film as "Compelling, and not entirely predictable, Sole's first (and only truly worthwhile) effort is driven by strong anti-Catholic messages (á la Pete Walker) and—even more pertinent—littered with unflinchingly disturbing scenes of violence that are reminiscent of [Dario] Argento's earlier handling of brutality."

In 2005, Alice, Sweet Alice ranked #89 on Bravo's The 100 Scariest Movie Moments for the scene when Alice scares Karen in the warehouse. In 2017, the film was ranked the fourth-best slasher film of all time by Complex magazine.

Proposed remake 
In 2007, director Dante Tomaselli announced his intent to direct a remake, confirmed that he had completed a script with Michael Gingold. Tomaselli intended to score the film using original music along with re-mastered and remixed music from the original film. In 2013 actress Kathryn Morris was cast in the role of Catherine Spages. The remake was to be set in the 1970s, as Tomaselli wanted to be "somewhat more recent while not at all losing its retro style". In May 2016, Tomaselli revealed that the film was delayed due to lack of funds, but also stated that he had been in recent contact with "solid prospects from European production companies and producers."

Notes and references

Notes

References

Sources

Further reading

External links 
 
 
 
 

1976 films
1976 horror films
1970s crime films
1976 drama films
1976 independent films
1970s mystery films
1970s psychological thriller films
1970s slasher films
Allied Artists films
American exploitation films
American independent films
American mystery films
American serial killer films
American slasher films
Films about Catholicism
Films about fratricide and sororicide
Films critical of the Catholic Church
Films set in 1961
Films set in New Jersey
Films set in religious buildings and structures
Films shot in New Jersey
Period horror films
Religious horror films
Films shot in 16 mm film
1970s English-language films
1970s American films